T. laevigata  may refer to:
 Terebra laevigata, a sea snail species
 Turbinella laevigata, the Brazilian chank, a very large sea snail species found in Brazil

See also
 Laevigata